Siti Nur Adibah Akma Mohd Fuad (born 25 March 1999) is a Malaysian professional racing cyclist.

Major results
2016
1st Ranau Mountainbike
National Road Championships
2nd Road Race
3rd Time Trial
Mountainbike (XC) Junior Asian Cycling Championships

2017 
3rd Downhill, National Mountainbike Championship

2020 
National Road Championships
1st  Road Race
1st  Time Trial

2022
 3rd Overall Princess Maha Chakri Sirindhon's Cup Tour of Thailand

References

1999 births
Living people
Malaysian female cyclists
Place of birth missing (living people)